Smadar Sheffi is the Chief Curator of the Contemporary Art Center, Ramle – CACR. 
She is an art critic, researcher of contemporary art and culture, and independent curator. 
Over past years, she has gained vast experience in curating exhibitions in historical structures, among them the Bialik House Museum, Jerusalem Artists House, Contemporary Art Center, Ramla-CACR, and the Pool of the Arches, Ramla. 
Dr. Sheffi’s bilingual blog of art criticism and notes on contemporary culture, The Window [1] has been active since 2012.

Biography 
Smadar Sheffi holds a Ph.D. in Art History from the Hebrew University of Jerusalem and is currently a lecturer at the COLLMAN-College of Management Academic Studies, Rishon Lezion.
She is a past lecturer at the Tel Aviv University, Hebrew University of Jerusalem, and the Art Department of the Academic College of Tel Aviv-Yafo.
Her research interests, among others, are representations of the Holocaust in contemporary art, Israeli art and Modernism. Sheffi’s doctoral dissertation, "From Vienna to Jerusalem: Forgotten portraits by Grete Wolf Krakauer", was written under the direction of Prof. Gannit Ankori.

Continuing her research on contemporary Israeli art, Dr. Sheffi recently delivered lectures at the Summer University for Jewish Studies, Hohenems, Austria (“Food in Modern Israeli Art”); The Jewish Museum,  Munich (“Reflection on the ‘other’: The image of the Arab in Israeli Art”); and at the American University, Washington DC at the conference Refugees and Asylum Seekers in Israel (“Portraying states of uprootedness in Israeli art”).

Dr. Sheffi is Chief Curator of the CACR – Contemporary Art Center Ramla, a new art initiative she launched in 2019. The curatorial program led by Dr. Sheffi embraces difference and multiple viewpoints as core values, addressing issues of diversity and civil society as reflected in contemporary Israeli art.

Dr. Sheffi is the art critic for Galei Zahal Radio since 2007, and for 20 years was the art critic for leading Haaretz. She is the author of numerous catalog articles and gallery texts, an art consultant, and leader of in-depth Israeli and international art tours.

Curated exhibitions 
 2012,  New Directions I – Beit Mani, Tel Aviv. (Participating artists: Shay Azoulay, Dana Yoeli, Roy Mordechay, Tali Navon,  Yehudit Raviv, Alon Kedem)
 2013  Screening Layers,  Beverly Barkat, Tel Aviv Artists’ House
 2013  New Directions  II – Beit Mani, Tel Aviv. (Participating artists: Shira Gopstein Moskowitz, Eitan Ben-Moshe, Yair Barak)
 2013   Art Intervention Project I, "To eternity’s end, beyond the sea?", Beit Bialik Museum, Tel Aviv. (Participating artists: Nir Adoni, Eliyahou Eric Bokobza,  Haya Rukin
 2014   Simon Adjiashvili, One city, one summer, Gallery Rothschild Fine Art Gallery,  Tel Aviv 
 2014   Art Intervention Project II: Revealment and Concealment, Beit Bialik Museum, Tel Aviv. (Participating artists: Itzik Badash, Nitzan Mintz, Adi Oz-Ari,  Yaara Zach, Daphna Shalom)
 2015   United Colors of Judaica – Eliahou Eric Bokobza – Beit Hatfutsot Museum of the Jewish People Ramat Aviv.
 2015   Lisa Gross, Turmoil, Tel Aviv Artists’ House
 2015   Art Intervention Project III: Behind the fence, Beit Bialik Museum, Tel Aviv. (Participating artists: Roni Hajaj, Jan Tichy, Tali Navon, Avi Sabah, Haimi Fenichel, Miki Kratsman)
 2016   genius loci, Rothschild Fine Art Gallery Tel Aviv. (Participating artists:  Yehuda Armoni, Uri Bleier, Hadar Gad, Tali Navon,  Mosh Kashi, Stuart Shils, Eleanor Ray
 2016   Intricate Affinities: Recollections of Western Tradition in Local Contemporary Art, Petah Tikva Museum of Art. (Participating artists: Amir Shefet, Gili Lavy, Ilana Hamawi, Nadav Naor, Simon Adjiashvili, Sasha Okun, Meydad Eliyahu, Yossi Mark, Mosh Kashi)
 2016   Art Intervention Project IV: Property and Festish, Beit Bialik Museum,  Tel Aviv (Participating artists: Eli Gur-Arie, Shay Id Alony,  Guy Zagursky, Rotem Ritov).
 2017  Partial Portrait: Fragmentation of Identity, Jerusalem Artists’ House (Participating artists: Asaf Shaham, Aram Gershuni, Yaron Lapid, Michal Heiman)
 2017 Art Intervention Project V: Eliyahou Eric Bokobza, Labor and Craft, Beit Bialik Museum, Tel Aviv 
 2018 Grete Wolf Krakauer: From Vienna to Jerusalem, Mishkan Museum of Art, Ein Harod (Guest artists: Gaston Zvi Ickowicz, Anna Yam, Marik Lechner)
 2018  Art Intervention Project VI: 'Me and you' – On checks and balances inspired by H.N. Bialik’s poem 'See Saw', Beit Bialik Museum, Tel Aviv (Participating artists: Raafat Hattab, Gabi Kricheli, Lital Rubinstein)
 2018  Dana Yoeli: Interior, first in "The Second Floor in Beit Bialik" - a series of site-specific, research-based exhibitions in cooperation with the Bialik Archive
 2019  Adi Oz-Ari: Epidermis, Photo Lab Gallery, Tel Aviv
 2019 Tomer Sapir: Kikalon, second in "The Second Floor in Beit Bialik" series
 2019 Inga Fonar Cocos, Something has gone wrong, third in "The Second Floor in Beit Bialik" series
 2019 Human Nature: Shared Sensitivities, the Jerusalem Biennale 2019 (Participating artists: Micha Ullman, Vardi Bobrow, David Benarroch, Avner Sher, Pesi Girsch)
 2019 Tali Navon: "Oneg Shabat" Anthology, forth in "The Second Floor in Beit Bialik" series
 2019 Things We Remember, CACR – Contemporary Art Center Ramla (Participating artists: Dganit Ben Admon, Mati Elmaliach)
 2019 Behind the City, CACR – Contemporary Art Center Ramla (Participating artists: Shlomit Fogel, Yehuda Armoni)
 2019 Beloved, CACR – Contemporary Art Center Ramla (Participating artists: Eliahou Eric Bokobza, Maya Smira)
 2020 Yana Rotner: "Sea of Silence", fifth in "The Second Floor in Beit Bialik" series
 2022 Dor Zlekha Levy: "Reflection", installation at the Pool of the Arches, Ramla
 2022 Meydad Eliyahu, "Copper Wing", CACR – Contemporary Art Center Ramla

Publications 
 2013 - Catalog for solo exhibition by Beverly Barkat
 2015 - Catalog for solo exhibition by Eric Eliahou Bokobza – United Colors of Judaica
 2015 - Booklet for solo exhibition by Lisa Gross Turmoil
 2016 - Exhibition Catalog, Intricate Affinities: Recollections of Western Tradition in Local Contemporary Art, Petach Tikva Museum of Art
 2018 - Catalog of the exhibition, Grete Wolf Krakauer: From Vienna to Jerusalem

Interviews and podcasts 
 Interviewed by Goel Pinto, Kan Culture, on "Partial portrait: Fragmentation of identity" (from 1:06:52)
 Podcast on Kan TV with Shiri Lev-Ari "War here, war there", Part 1 and Part 2
 Interview by London et Kirshenbaum 04.04.18 on "Grete Wolf Krakauer: From Vienna to Jerusalem" (from 0:38:04)
 Interview on Grete Wolf Krakauer, "Eretz Vateva" Magazine, #181 "Aliya" (June 2018)
 Interview with Goel Pinto, Kan Culture, on 'Me and you' - Checks and balances inspired by H.N. Bialik’s poem 'See Saw' (from 1:01:34)
Lecture at the Annual Conference of the Association of Israeli Archivists, about the Second Floor in Beit Bialik series
Lecture at the Institute for Israeli Art at the Academic College of Tel Aviv-Yafo, about Pesi Girsch
Appearance in an item in the art and culture magazine of "Kan 11" about "Bloved" (from 10:53)

References 

Israeli art critics
Israeli curators
Hebrew University of Jerusalem alumni
Israeli women curators